Oria is a railway station in Oria, Italy. The station is located on the Taranto–Brindisi railway. The train services are operated by Trenitalia.

Train services
The station is served by the following service(s):

Local services (Treno regionale) Taranto - Francavilla Fontana - Brindisi

References

This article is based upon a translation of the Italian language version as at October 2014.

Railway stations in Apulia
Buildings and structures in the Province of Brindisi
Railway stations opened in 1886
1886 establishments in Italy
Railway stations in Italy opened in the 19th century